Starpeace is a 1985 concept album by Yoko Ono.

Starpeace may also refer to:

 StarPeace, a city-building computer game
 StarPeace Project, a global astronomy project